The Department of Education (DENI) (Ulster-Scots: Männystrie o Lear) is a devolved Northern Irish government department in the Northern Ireland Executive.  The minister with overall responsibility for the department is the Minister of Education.

Aim
The department's overall vision is "to ensure that every learner fulfils her or his potential at each stage of development". Its key stated priorities are: raising Standards for all; closing the performance gap, increasing access and equality; developing the education workforce; improving the "learning environment"; and transforming education management.

Responsibilities
The department is responsible for the following levels of education:
 pre-school
 primary
 post-primary
 special

Until 2016 the former Department for Employment and Learning was responsible for further and higher education policy in Northern Ireland. Further and higher education are now the responsibility of the Department for the Economy.

The Department of Education also covers:
 youth policy
 community relations within and between schools
 teacher education and salaries

As an organisation, its key functions include advising the minister on the determination of education policy, framing legislation, accounting for the effectiveness of the education system, allocating, and monitoring and accounting for resources.

Through the Education and Training Inspectorate, it evaluates and reports on the quality of teaching and learning and teacher education.

Administration of the education system is delegated to a single combined authority, funded by the department:

 Education Authority

Its main counterpart in the United Kingdom Government is the Department for Education. The main counterpart in the Irish Government is the Department of Education.

History
A Ministry of Education was established at the foundation of Northern Ireland in June 1921 and was subsequently renamed the Department of Education under direct rule, introduced in March 1972.  An education ministry was also included in the Northern Ireland Executive briefly formed in 1974. The department's remit under direct rule was much wider, incorporating cultural and sport policy (now held by the Department of Culture, Arts and Leisure) and further and higher education (now held by the Department for Employment and Learning).

Following a referendum on the Belfast Agreement on 23 May 1998 and the granting of royal assent to the Northern Ireland Act 1998 on 19 November 1998, a Northern Ireland Assembly and Northern Ireland Executive were established by the United Kingdom Government under Prime Minister Tony Blair. The Department of Education (with its reduced remit) was therefore one of the six direct rule Northern Ireland departments that continued in existence after devolution, following the Northern Ireland Act 1998 and The Departments (Northern Ireland) Order 1999.

A devolved minister took office on 2 December 1999. Devolution was suspended for four periods, during which the department came under the responsibility of direct rule ministers from the Northern Ireland Office:
 between 12 February 2000 and 30 May 2000;
 on 11 August 2001;
 on 22 September 2001;
 between 15 October 2002 and 8 May 2007.

Since 8 May 2007, devolution has operated without interruption. On 11 January 2012, the First Minister and deputy First Minister, Peter Robinson and Martin McGuinness respectively, announced their intention to abolish the Department for Employment and Learning.

Its functions would be "divided principally" between the Department of Education and the Department of Enterprise, Trade and Investment "in an agreed manner". The proposal was resisted by the Alliance Party, which viewed it as "power grab" by the Democratic Unionist Party and Sinn Féin, but was approved on 18 January 2012. No timescale for the abolition was outlined and the department remained in operation, as of late March 2012.

From 2 December 1999 to 25 May 2016, the department was headed by Sinn Féin legislators. It was not until 25 May 2016 that the Democratic Unionist Party (DUP)'s Peter Weir became the first non-Sinn Féin politician to head the Northern Ireland Department of Education.

Ministers of education

Direct rule ministers
During the periods of suspension, the following ministers of the Northern Ireland Office/Education Secretaries of the British Department for Education were responsible for the department:

 George Howarth (2000)
 Jane Kennedy (2002–04)
 Barry Gardiner (2002–04)
 Angela Smith (2005–06)
 Maria Eagle (2006–07)

See also
 Committee for Education
 List of government ministers in Northern Ireland

References

External links
 Department of Education
 Digital Education Resource Archive (DERA) UCL Institute of Education
  

Northern Ireland
Northern Ireland Executive
Education administration in Northern Ireland
Ministries established in 1999
1999 establishments in Northern Ireland